Dan Shaw (born c. 1934) is a retired Canadian football player who played for the Toronto Argonauts.

References

Living people
1930s births
Place of birth missing (living people)
Canadian football guards
Toronto Argonauts players